Boomer Bay is a rural locality in the local government area (LGA) of Sorell in the South-east LGA region of Tasmania. The 2016 census recorded a population of 93 for the state suburb of Boomer Bay.
It is also a bay within Blackman Bay. 
Boomer Bay contains Boomer Island.

History 
Boomer Bay is a confirmed locality.

Geography
The eastern boundary follows the shoreline of Blackman Bay.

Road infrastructure 
Route A9 (Arthur Highway) runs along part of the western boundary. From there, Boomer Road and Bay Road provide access to the locality.

References

Bays of Tasmania
South East coast of Tasmania
Towns in Tasmania
Localities of Sorell Council